In mathematics, a Fatou–Bieberbach domain is a proper subdomain of , biholomorphically equivalent to  . That is, an open set  is called a Fatou–Bieberbach domain if there exists a bijective holomorphic function  whose inverse function  is holomorphic. It is well-known that the inverse  can not be polynomial.

History 
As a consequence of the Riemann mapping theorem, there are no Fatou–Bieberbach domains in the case n = 1.
Pierre Fatou and Ludwig Bieberbach first explored such domains in  higher dimensions in the 1920s, hence the name given to them later. Since the 1980s, Fatou–Bieberbach domains have again become the subject of mathematical research.

References 
 Fatou, Pierre: "Sur les fonctions méromorphes de deux variables. Sur certains fonctions uniformes de deux variables." C.R. Paris 175 (1922)
 Bieberbach, Ludwig: "Beispiel zweier ganzer Funktionen zweier komplexer Variablen, welche eine schlichte volumtreue Abbildung des  auf einen Teil seiner selbst vermitteln". Preussische Akademie der Wissenschaften. Sitzungsberichte (1933)
Trans. Amer. Math. Soc. 310 (1988) 

Several complex variables
Inverse functions